Walter Omar Fiori (born 19 January 1961) is an Argentine football manager and former player who played as a forward.

Career
Born in Mar del Plata, Fiori notably represented Primera División sides Tigre, Talleres de Córdoba, Racing Club, Chaco For Ever and Instituto. He retired in 1997 at the age of 36, with El Porvenir.

After retiring, Fiori joined Sporting Cristal's technical staff in 2007 as an assistant. He was also an interim after the dismissal of Jorge Sampaoli, but returned to his previous role after the arrival of Juan Carlos Oblitas. 

Fiori subsequently worked with Edgardo Bauza at LDU Quito and San Lorenzo, being in charge of the youth setup. In 2015, he joined Ituzaingó; initially assigned to the youth categories, he was named first team manager on 19 June 2016, but left the following 3 January after accepting an offer to become Gerardo Ameli's assistant at Sport Rosario.

Fiori continued to work with Ameli at Deportivo Municipal and Deportes Antofagasta, being an interim manager of the latter in May 2019 after Ameli left. In September 2019, he moved to Universidad Técnica de Cajamarca, also as an assistant.

In 2020, Fiori returned to work with Ameli at Ayacucho FC. On 18 December of that year, he was named manager of the club for the 2021 campaign.

References

External links

1961 births
Living people
Sportspeople from Mar del Plata
Argentine footballers
Association football midfielders
Argentine Primera División players
Primera Nacional players
Club Atlético Tigre footballers
Talleres de Córdoba footballers
Racing Club de Avellaneda footballers
Chaco For Ever footballers
Instituto footballers
Club Atlético San Miguel footballers
Club Atlético Colegiales (Argentina) players
Sportivo Italiano footballers
El Porvenir footballers
Argentine football managers
Peruvian Primera División managers
Sporting Cristal managers
Sport Boys managers
Deportes Antofagasta managers
Argentine expatriate football managers
Argentine expatriate sportspeople in Peru
Argentine expatriate sportspeople in Chile
Expatriate football managers in Peru
Expatriate football managers in Chile
Ayacucho FC managers